Asho people, one of the tribes of the Chin people, are native to Arakan, Magwe Region, Pegu Region, Irrawaddy Region and some in Yangon Region. They are much influenced by the Burmese in their daily life. They are well educated and having high profile jobs in the Myanmar government.

Demography
The native speakers of Asho language are around 10,000. The total population of the Asho people are around 400,000. In ancient Burmese scriptures, they are called Khyeng. They are also known as Plain Chin, as they are living in the plains of Myanmar. Unlike other Chin clans, their main problem is communications among themselves due to distances between their villages, not the differences in their dialects.

Religion 
Unlike other Chin clans, many of them are Buddhist. The Christian missionaries also used Burmese script for writing Asho language. Rev. G. Whitehead of Anglican Society for the Propagation of the Gospel, introduced the Latin script for writing and published Gospel of Mark in 1921. A Bible Society from Rangoon published New Testament in 1954 in Burmese script.

References

Mizo clans